Adel Sarshar  is an Iranian football defender who since 2014 has played for the Iranian football club Gostaresh Foolad in the Iran Pro League.

References

1992 births
Living people
Iranian footballers
Association football defenders
Gostaresh Foulad F.C. players
F.C. Aboomoslem players